Dean Pond is a lake in Putnam County, in the U.S. state of New York.

Dean Pond was named after the local Dean family.

References

Landforms of Putnam County, New York
Ponds of New York (state)